Katherine E. Standefer is an American writer of creative nonfiction. She was a recipient of the 2015 Iowa Review Award in Nonfiction.

Biography
She was born in the Chicago metropolitan area and currently lives in New Mexico. Standefer's book Lightning Flowers: My Journey to Uncover the Cost of Saving A Life was a non-fiction finalist for the Kirkus Prize in 2020. She has also written for High Country News and the Los Angeles Times.  In 2018, Standefer was a Logan Nonfiction Fellow at The Carey Institute for Global Good in Rensselaerville, New York.

Lightning Flowers: My Journey to Uncover the Cost of Saving A Life was also a New York Times Book Review Editor's Choice/Staff Pick and a NYTBR's Group Text Pick. It was named one of the Best Books of Fall 2020 by O, The Oprah Magazine’s ,

Standefer’s work appeared in The Best American Essays (BAE) 2016.

Awards and recognition
She was named “notable” in BAE 2017, 2019, and 2020. She won the 2015 Iowa Review Award in Nonfiction.

References

External links 

1985 births
Living people
Colorado College alumni
University of Arizona alumni
American essayists
21st-century American writers
21st-century American women writers
People from Arlington Heights, Illinois